Gush (also Romanized as Gūsh) is a village in Neh Rural District, in the Central District of Nehbandan County, South Khorasan Province, Iran. At the 2006 census, its population was 121, in 32 families.

References 

Populated places in Nehbandan County